Gauruncus tomaszi is a species of moth of the family Tortricidae. It is found in Venezuela.

The wingspan is 17 mm. The ground colour of the forewings is olive brown, in the postbasal and terminal parts mixed with ferruginous. The hindwings are brownish grey.

Etymology
The species is named in honour of Dr. Tomasz Pyrcz.

References

Moths described in 2013
Euliini